Oxyrhopus erdisii is a species of snake in the family Colubridae.  The species is native to Peru.

References

Oxyrhopus
Snakes of South America
Reptiles of Peru
Endemic fauna of Peru
Reptiles described in 1913
Taxa named by Thomas Barbour